The 2006 World Wrestling Entertainment (WWE) brand extension draft, also known as the 2006 ECW draft, was the fourth WWE draft that took place at the Tacoma Dome in Tacoma, Washington, on May 29. The draft aired on WWE's  flagship program Raw. The draft featured ECW representative Paul Heyman receiving two total draft picks from the existing SmackDown! and Raw rosters for the newly created ECW brand.

Background 
After World Wrestling Entertainment, Inc. bought all the assets of Extreme Championship Wrestling (ECW) in 2003, the company began releasing DVDs promoting the original ECW. Soon afterwards, the company promoted shows for ECW alumni entitled, One Night Stand in 2005 and in 2006. On May 25, 2006, WWE announced the launch of a new brand, ECW, a revival of original promotion. The new brand would later debut its television show on the Sci Fi Channel on June 13, 2006.

Selections

Aftermath
Fifteen days after the draft ECW would hold its premiere episode on June 13, 2006. Although not drafted, Tazz later defected from SmackDown! to ECW, Big Show from Raw to ECW, and Randy Orton from SmackDown! to Raw. In August 2006, after a few appearances, Kurt Angle requested and was granted his release from his WWE contract.

On February 2, 2010, WWE Chairman Vince McMahon announced that ECW would air its final episode on February 16, 2010. The ECW brand was disbanded after the final show, with every ECW wrestler becoming a free agent, eligible to join either the Raw or SmackDown brands. The original brand extension would end in August 2011.

References

History of WWE
WWE draft
ECW (WWE brand)
2006 in professional wrestling
Professional wrestling in Washington (state)
May 2006 events in the United States
Events in Washington (state)